Armen Tigranyan (born 27 November 1985) is an Armenian former football midfielder. He was also a member of the Armenia national team, and has participated in 3 international matches since his debut in an away 2006 World Cup qualification match against Czech Republic on 7 September 2005.

Achievements
Armenian Premier League with Pyunik: 2005, 2006
Armenian Supercup with Pyunik: 2006

External links
 
 
 
 

1985 births
Living people
Footballers from Gyumri
Armenian footballers
FC Shirak players
FC Pyunik players
FC Gandzasar Kapan players
Zob Ahan Esfahan F.C. players
FC Gomel players
Ulisses FC players
Armenian Premier League players
Armenian expatriate footballers
Expatriate footballers in Iran
Expatriate footballers in Belarus
Armenian expatriate sportspeople in Iran
Armenian expatriate sportspeople in Belarus
Association football midfielders
Armenia international footballers
Armenia under-21 international footballers